the HP xb3000 Notebook Expansion Base is a laptop docking station manufactured by Hewlett-Packard Company.  Its notable features an inclining tray, a PCI expansion port 3 cable interface (with adapter for other PCI expansion port interface), and an integrated 16-bit AT hard drive bay.  The device is shipped with a USB wireless receiver, wireless keyboard and mouse.

Specifications

Hosted ports 
3.5 mm stereo TRS connector, 3.5 mm mono microphone TRS connector, 6 USB 2.0, DC power input, composite video out, S-video out, YPbPr component video out, SPDIF digital audio out, VGA, 10/100 Ethernet, separate DC power input cutout for integrated hard disk drive bay, proprietary 16-bit AT hard drive interface.

Optional features/components 
 HP 400 GB 7200 RPM Hard Drive Kit (HP product number RR041AA#ABA).  The hard drive caddy has a 16-bit AT cable interface for the hard drive and a proprietary 16-bit connector for the docking station.

Compatible notebook PCs 
 HP Pavilion dv9000, dv8000, dv6000, dv5000, dv4000, dv2000, dv1400, tx1000, tx2500, ze2000, DV6 and DV7 series
 Compaq Presario V6000, V5000, V4000, V3000, V2000, M2000 series
 HP Compaq nx4820
 HP Special Edition L2000 series

Undocumented but compatible:
 HP HDX 18t
 HP HDX 16t

Reviews 
 PC World user reviews

References 

Docking stations